Scythris divergens is a moth of the family Scythrididae. It was described by Bengt Å. Bengtsson in 2005. It is found in Turkey, Lebanon, Syria and Iraq.

References

divergens
Moths described in 2005
Moths of the Middle East